The 2022–23 season is the 125th season in the existence of Bristol City Football Club and the club's eighth consecutive season in the Championship. In addition to the league, they will also compete in the 2022–23 FA Cup and the 2022–23 EFL Cup.

Squad

Statistics

Players with names in italics and marked * were on loan from another club for the whole of their season with Bristol City.

|-
!colspan=14|Players who left the club during the season:

|}

Goals record

Disciplinary record

Transfers

In

Out

Loans in

Loans out

Pre-season and friendlies
Bristol City announced their first pre-season fixture on May 24, with a trip to Plymouth Argyle scheduled. A second friendly, against Bournemouth was later confirmed.

Competitions

Overall record

Championship

League table

Results summary

Results by round

Matches

On 23 June, the league fixtures were announced.

FA Cup

The Robins were drawn at home to Swansea City in the third round, against West Bromwich Albion in the fourth round and also to Manchester City in the fifth round.

EFL Cup

Bristol City were drawn away to Coventry City in the first round and to Wycombe Wanderers in the second round.

References

External links

Bristol City F.C. seasons
Bristol City F.C.
English football clubs 2022–23 season